Saemundssonia is a genus of chewing lice belonging to the family Philopteridae. These lice are parasitic on aquatic birds, especially on members of the order Charadriiformes, but also on Anseriformes, Gruiformes, Pelecaniformes and Procellariiformes. Members of this genus have a broad triangular head bearing a frontal plate with a dark backwards-pointing projection.

Species
Species include:
S. acutipecta
S. boschi
S. calva
S. celidoxa
S. fraterculae
S. grylle
S. insolita
S. laticaudata
S. merguli
S. montereyi
S. wumisuzume

References

Lice
Parasites of birds